Spur 527 is a  spur route in Midtown Houston in the U.S. state of Texas.  The roadway is a freeway spur that feeds traffic from the Southwest Freeway (Interstate 69/U.S. Highway 59) into Downtown Houston. The route is mostly unsigned, except for a sign posted on the southbound side, right after an intersection with Smith Street.

History 
On July 30, 1976, Spur 527 was designated as a spur of US 59 in Houston.  The freeway was the original routing of US 59 into downtown before being rerouted further east.  The freeway was built in the early 1960s as the overpasses at Richmond Avenue and Alabama Street had been completed by 1961.

On July 1, 2019, the Brazos St exit was closed, forcing all traffic to exit at Louisiana St. Houston Public Works said the “bridge deck has deteriorated significantly and is being closed immediately to protect the community from falling debris.” On February 26, 2020, Houston Public Works released a concept design for a park where the Brazos St Bridge now stands. Repairs to the bridge have stalled amid debate between stakeholders. On January 27, 2021, the exit ramp reopened two weeks ahead of schedule following repairs.

Route description 
Spur 527 branches off I-69/US 59 on the west side of Midtown and heads northeast, feeding traffic into downtown.  It provides access to Richmond Avenue and Travis Street before curving towards the north as it passes over Alabama Street.  As it continues north through Midtown, the spur provides access to Louisiana Street before coming to an end at Elgin Street.  The northbound lanes continue onto Brazos Street past Elgin Street and Bagby Street becomes the southbound lanes of Spur 527 after crossing Elgin Street.

Exit list

References

Freeways in Houston
527
U.S. Route 59